Keturah Orji (born March 5, 1996) is an American track and field athlete specializing in the triple jump. She has set a new US triple jump record twice.

Early life
Born in Hoboken, New Jersey to Nigerian parents, Orji grew up in Mount Olive Township, New Jersey and graduated from Mount Olive High School in 2014.

In 2010, Orji was a level 8 gymnast at Giant Gymnastics, Inc. in Hackettstown, New Jersey. At the 2010 New Jersey state championships, she performed the All-Around (Vault, Bars, Beam and Floor). Orji wanted to become an Olympic gymnast as a youth. Orji credits doing gymnastics when she was young for part of her early success. She won the 2013-2014 New Jersey State Interscholastic Athletic Association girls track and field Gatorade Player of the Year awards. Orji defended her New Jersey Meet of Champions Triple jump crown, set a New Jersey state record with a 42-6 1/2 and improved on the Morris County long jump record of 20–2 in 2013. She had a high school personal best triple jump of 44 feet 11 inches She is a 2014 graduate of Mount Olive High School (New Jersey) in Flanders.

NCAA 
Orji placed second 2015 NCAA Division I Indoor Track and Field Championships triple jump and placed 13th in long jump. She won 2015 NCAA Division I Outdoor Track and Field Championships triple jump setting an American junior record and placed 7th in long jump and was named the 2016 Southeastern Conference Scholar-Athlete of the Year as well as the SEC Field Athlete of the Year. In 2016, Orji placed won 2016 NCAA Division I Indoor Track and Field Championships triple jump and placed 4th in long jump and was named the U.S. Track & Field and Cross Country Coaches Association (USTFCCCA) National Women's Outdoor Field Athlete of the Year in 2015–2016.

Orji won 2016 NCAA Division I Outdoor Track and Field Championships triple jump and placed 6th in long jump. She won fan vote for 2015-2016 Bowerman Award, The Bowerman award is collegiate track & field's highest individual honor.

In 2017, she won her fifth SEC Title as a champion in the triple jump  at Vanderbilt University at the 2017 SEC Indoor track and field championships where she set SEC, college, NCAA Division I, and American records surpassing 1996 US Olympian and 10 time USATF national champion Sheila Hudson. Orji also won the 2017 NCAA Division I Indoor Track and Field Championships triple jump title and placed 3rd in long jump. Orji won her sixth SEC Title as a champion in the triple jump  at University of South Carolina at the 2017 SEC Outdoor track and field championships and placed 5th in long jump  behind champion Quanesha Burks .

She won 2017 NCAA Division I Outdoor Track and Field Championships triple jump title and placed 2nd in long jump behind Georgia Lady Bulldogs teammate and champion Kate Hall. Orji was a 2017 Bowerman Award finalist.

Orji won her seventh SEC Title as a champion in the triple jump  at Texas A&M University at the 2018 SEC Indoor track and field championships and placed 2nd in long jump  behind champion Kate Hall .

Orji won 2018 NCAA Division I Indoor Track and Field Championships triple jump title  and placed 2nd in long jump  behind champion Kate Hall  ahead of Georgia Lady Bulldogs teammate Tara Davis. She won her ninth SEC Title triple jump and long jump championship titles jumping  and  respectively earning 20 points for the Georgia Lady Bulldogs in Knoxville, Tennessee where the Tennessee Volunteers hosted the 2018 SEC Outdoor track and field championships. Orji set a collegiate record in the triple jump in Knoxville.

She also won the 2018 NCAA Division I Outdoor Track and Field Championships triple jump and long jump championship titles jumping  and  respectively earning 20 points for the Georgia Lady Bulldogs in Eugene, Oregon / University of Oregon where the Oregon Ducks hosted the 2018 NCAA Division I Outdoor Track and Field Championships.

In 2018, Orji become first woman to win eight NCAA titles in Field events. Orji was named winner of The Bowerman for the 2018 track & field seasons. She was the first three-time female finalist in award history.

Professional career
Orji set the triple jump American Junior record at  while winning the 2015 NCAA Outdoor Championships. She represented her country at the 2016 World Indoor Championships finishing fourth. She set the American record at  while winning the 2016 NCAA Outdoor Championships.

Orji jumped  (+0.0 m/s, Rio de Janeiro 2016) Video of record setting jump American Record since broken by Tori Franklin. At the 2016 Olympics, she triple jumped  American record at Athletics at the 2016 Summer Olympics – Women's triple jump to place fourth.

Orji was recognized as one of three finalists for The Bowerman Award presented by USTFCCCA, the highest collegiate honor in track and field, December 16, 2016 on Friday night in Orlando after being honored by the Southeastern Conference outdoor Scholar-Athlete of the Year. Mount Olive Superintendent Larrie Reynolds presented Orji with a plaque on Monday night, at a meeting which also acknowledged all fall athletes in the district. She was also presented with a "key to the city" at a township council workshop meeting on Tuesday night.

Injury forced Orji from competing in the 2017 World Championships in Athletics – Women's triple jump in London Stadium after qualifying at 2017 USA Outdoor Track and Field Championships where Orji triple jumped  to win in 95 degree heat at Hornet Stadium (Sacramento). Orji was recognized as one of three finalists for The Bowerman Award presented by USTFCCCA in 2017.

Orji opened her final year by topping her own collegiate, NCAA Division 1 and American Indoor Records in the triple jump in 14.53 m (47 ft 8 in) at the Clemson Invitational on Saturday January 20, 2018. She placed 5th in the triple jump in Birmingham at 2018 IAAF World Indoor Championships after she jumped .

Orji placed 2nd in the triple jump in London at 2018 Athletics World Cup after she jumped .

Orji won 2018 USA Outdoor Track and Field Championships where Orji triple jumped  setting a US Championship triple jump record.

International competitions

Personal bests 
Outdoor
Long jump –  (+1.0 m/s, Knoxville, Tennessee 2018)
Triple jump –  (+1 m/s, Chula Vista High Performance 2021) American Outdoor Record

Indoor
Long jump –  (Nashville, Tennessee 2017)
Triple jump –  (Clemson, South Carolina 2018) former American Indoor Record

References

1996 births
Living people
American female triple jumpers
Track and field athletes from New Jersey
Georgia Lady Bulldogs track and field athletes
African-American female track and field athletes
Sportspeople from Morris County, New Jersey
Sportspeople from Hoboken, New Jersey
People from Mount Olive Township, New Jersey
Athletes (track and field) at the 2016 Summer Olympics
Olympic track and field athletes of the United States
Athletes (track and field) at the 2019 Pan American Games
Pan American Games silver medalists for the United States
Pan American Games medalists in athletics (track and field)
Pan American Games track and field athletes for the United States
USA Outdoor Track and Field Championships winners
USA Indoor Track and Field Championships winners
Medalists at the 2019 Pan American Games
Athletes (track and field) at the 2020 Summer Olympics
21st-century African-American sportspeople
21st-century African-American women